EnCap was a proposal to build golf courses and homes on remediated landfills in the New Jersey Meadowlands in three communities in Bergen County, New Jersey, United States: Lyndhurst, North Arlington and Rutherford.

In November 2007, Donald Trump announced a deal in which he would take over development of the troubled project. Trump's proposal included a world-class golf course designed by Tom Fazio, homes and a hotel.

On May 27, 2008, the New Jersey Meadowlands Commission terminated its agreement with EnCap Golf Holdings, the company that had the contract to redevelop the  site, after the company had missed targets to clean up the landfills as part of the project.

References

Lyndhurst, New Jersey
North Arlington, New Jersey
Rutherford, New Jersey
New Jersey Meadowlands District